The Weber's glands are muciparous glands on the side of the tongue. They are a minor salivary gland in the peritonsillar space. The glands are named after German anatomist Moritz Ignaz Weber. They clear the peritonsillar space of debris.

References 

Glands
Tongue
Anatomy named for one who described it